József Hámori (20 March 1932 – 1 May 2021) was a Hungarian biologist and politician, who served as Minister of Culture between 1998 and 1999. He was a member of the Batthyány Society of Professors.

Publications

Books
Mi a neurobiológia? (1976)
Idegsejttől a gondolatig (1982)
Nem tudja a jobbkéz, mit csinál a bal (1985)
Veszélyeztetett értelem (1988)
Az emberi agy aszimmetriái (1999)
Agy, hit, számítógép (co-author, 2004)

Scientific works
The Inductive Role of Presynaptic Axons in the Development of Postsynaptic Spines (Brain Res., 1973)
Specific Antibody-fragments Against the Postsynaptic Web (Nature, co-author, 1973)
Triadic Synaptic Arrangements and Their Possible Significance in the Lateral Geniculate Nucleus of the Monkey (Brain Res., co-author, 1974)
Presynaptic Dendrites and Perikarya in Deafferented Cerebellar Cortex (Procl. National Academy of Science, co-author, 1982)
Immunogold Electron Microscopic Demonstration of Glutamate and GABA in Normal and Deafferented Cerebellar Cortex: Correlation Between Transmitter Content and Synaptic Vesicle Size (Journal of Histochem. and Cytochem., co-author, 1990)
Metabotrop Glutamate Receptor Type 1a Expressing Unipolar Brush Cells in the Cerebellar Cortex of Different Species: a Comparative Quantitative Study (Journal of Neuroscientific Research, co-author, 1999)
Az emberi agy plaszticitása (Magyar Tudomány, 2005)

Honours and awards 

 1972 Academy Prize
 1990 Member of the Hungarian Academy of Sciences
 1992 Member of Academia Europaea
 1994 Széchenyi Prize
 1996 Grastyán Prize
 1999 UNESCO Einstein Gold Medal
 2001 Ipolyi Arnold Prize

References

External links
 Adatlap az Magyar Tudományos Akadémia honlapján, publikációs listával
 Életrajz az MTA honlapján
 Adatlap a Mindentudás Egyetemének oldalán

1932 births
2021 deaths
Culture ministers of Hungary
Hungarian biologists
Members of the European Academy of Sciences and Arts
People from Jász-Nagykun-Szolnok County